Barbara Low may refer to:
 Barbara Low (psychoanalyst)
 Barbara Low (biochemist)